Richard Schmidt (born January 31, 1965) is a former professional tennis player from the United States.

Biography
Born in Chicago, Schmidt later moved to Madison, Wisconsin and was on the collegiate team at the University of Arkansas. He twice earned All-American honors while partnering Tim Siegel in doubles. The pair were semi-finalists in the 1986 NCAA Championships.

From the start of 1987 he began competing on the professional circuit. As a qualifier at the 1988 Australian Open he pushed eighth seed Slobodan Živojinović to four sets in the first round, losing two of those sets in tiebreaks. At his only other appearance in the men's singles draw of a Grand Slam, the 1989 US Open, he squandered a two-set lead over Miguel Nido in the opening round, to lose in five. He continued to appear in the qualifying rounds of Grand Slams, including at Wimbledon, but was unable to make it through again, although he did manage to get past Pat Rafter in the 1992 US Open qualifiers. On the ATP Tour his most noted performance came at the 1992 Cincinnati Open, a top-tier Championship Series (Masters) tournament, where he beat Jeff Tarango, before losing in the second round to world number one Jim Courier.

As a doubles player his best performances include making the third round of the 1988 Australian Open, with Tim Siegel. At the 1989 Volvo International in Stratton Mountain, he and Derrick Rostagno had a win over a doubles team consisting of Jim Courier and Pete Sampras. He won a total of four Challenger doubles titles.

Challenger titles

Doubles: (4)

References

External links
 
 

1965 births
Living people
American male tennis players
Arkansas Razorbacks men's tennis players
Tennis people from Illinois
Tennis people from Wisconsin
Sportspeople from Madison, Wisconsin
People from Harvey, Illinois